Begonia tonkinensis is a plant species in the family Begoniaceae. The species is part of the section Diploclinium. It was described in 1919 by François Gagnepain.

Description 
The Vietnamese name is Thu hải đường bắc bộ. It is a vascular plant, "commonly upright-stemmed, rhizomatous, or tuberous".

Distribution 
This species is native to Vietnam.

References

External links 

Begonia tonkinensis Gagnep.

tonkinensis
Flora of Vietnam